The John Rankin House is a historic house museum at 6152 Rankin Hill Road in Ripley, Ohio.  Built in 1828, it was home to Presbyterian abolitionist John Rankin, and was one of the original stops on the Underground Railroad.  Harriet Beecher Stowe's visit to Rankin provided some of the story that became Uncle Tom's Cabin.  The house was acquired by the State of Ohio in 1938 and is now operated by the Ohio History Connection and opened for tours.  It was designated a National Historic Landmark in 1997.

Description and history
The John Rankin House occupies a prominent position on a hill overlooking the town of Ripley and the Ohio River. The house is a modest -story brick structure, with a side-facing gabled roof. The main facade is three bays wide, with a center entrance flanked by sash windows in rectangular openings. The entry is sheltered by a portico with a shallow-pitch gable roof and square posts. The interior follows a typical center hall plan, with four rooms on the ground floor and two small bedrooms in the attic level. The interior retains original features and finishes, including wide floor boards and carved fireplace surrounds.

The house was built in 1828 by the abolitionist Presbyterian minister John Rankin, and it is where he raised a large family.  It also became a significant stopping point for fugitive slaves who had crossed the river from Kentucky, a slave state, often under guidance from a "conductor" on the Underground Railroad.  Rankin is estimated to have assisted in securing the freedom of more than 2,000 slaves, often at great personal risk.  The house was often under surveillance by slave catchers, and some slave owners had placed a price on his head.  The Rankins sold the house after the American Civil War, and it was purchased by the state in 1938 for use as a historic site.

See also
John P. Parker House, owned by another conductor on the Underground Railroad in Ripley
List of Underground Railroad sites
List of National Historic Landmarks in Ohio

References

External links

Ohio History Connection
Ripley Ohio Historic Buildings
Aboard the Underground Railroad National Park Service
Historic American Buildings Survey

National Historic Landmarks in Ohio
Houses on the National Register of Historic Places in Ohio
Houses completed in 1828
Historic house museums in Ohio
Houses on the Underground Railroad
Museums in Brown County, Ohio
National Register of Historic Places in Brown County, Ohio
African-American museums in Ohio
Ohio History Connection
Houses in Brown County, Ohio